Henry Woods (1764–1826) was an American politician and land speculator who served as a United States representative from Pennsylvania.

Early life
Born in Bedford in the Province of Pennsylvania, Woods had limited schooling, and attended the subscription schools of Bedford County. He studied law, was admitted to the bar in 1792, and began his practice in Bedford.

Career
Elected as a Federalist to the Sixth and Seventh Congresses, Woods served as a United States Representative for the tenth district of Pennsylvania from March 4, 1799 to March 3, 1803.

He then returned to his business interests of land speculation and law as a lawyer.

Woods was a slave owner.

Death
Woods died in 1826 (age about 62 years). The location of his interment is unknown. His brother, John Woods, was also a U.S. Representative from Pennsylvania.

References

External links

 The Political Graveyard

1764 births
1826 deaths
People from Bedford, Pennsylvania
Pennsylvania lawyers
Federalist Party members of the United States House of Representatives from Pennsylvania
19th-century American lawyers
18th-century American politicians
19th-century American politicians